Caima may refer to:
 Caima River
 Caima (barangay) in Sipocot, Camarines Sur
 Caima (company) from Portugal